The 1996 Historic Formula One Championship was the second season of the Historic Formula One Championship. It began at Donington Park on May 5 and ended at Brno on September 29.

It was won by Michael Schryver driving a Lotus 72 despite not winning any of the five races.

Calendar

References

1996 in motorsport
Historic Formula One Championship